Exechia spinuligera is a Palearctic species of fungus gnat in the family Mycetophilidae. Exechia contaminata is chiefly or exclusively associated with Russula and Lactarius.

References

External links 
Images representing Exechia spinuligera  at BOLD

Mycetophilidae